The Biferten Glacier is a  glacier (2005) situated in the Glarus Alps in the canton of Glarus in Switzerland. The glacier is located east of the Tödi.

See also
List of glaciers in Switzerland
Swiss Alps

External links
Swiss glacier monitoring network

Glaciers of Switzerland
Glaciers of the Alps
GBiferten